John G. Wallenmeier Jr. (October 10, 1862 – October 25, 1917) was an American politician.

Life
John G. Wallenmeier was born in Buffalo, New York on October 10, 1862, and grew up in the town of Tonawanda. In 1896, he supported William McKinley for President at the Republican New York state convention against the majority led by Thomas C. Platt who supported Levi P. Morton. After McKinley's election, he was appointed Postmaster of Tonawanda.

He married Hattie May Koch on November 14, 1883.

He was an alternate delegate to the 1904 Republican National Convention. He was New York State Treasurer from 1905 to 1906, elected in 1904, but was defeated for re-election in 1906 by Democrat Julius Hauser.

He died at his home in Tonawanda on October 25, 1917.

References

Sources
The Political Graveyard: Index to Politicians: Wallach to Walseth at politicalgraveyard.com Political Graveyard
The Rep. nominees, in NYT on September 16, 1904
The Rep. ticket, in NYT on September 27, 1906
Campaign expenses filed, in NYT on November 14, 1906

1862 births
1917 deaths
New York State Treasurers
People from Tonawanda, New York
New York (state) postmasters
19th-century American politicians